La parada de Maimós is a 1968 book by Venezuelan critic and writer Alfredo Armas Alfonzo.

1968 novels
Venezuelan novels